Tennessee's 1st congressional district is the congressional district of northeast Tennessee, including all of Carter, Cocke, Greene, Hamblen, Hancock, Hawkins, Johnson, Sullivan, Unicoi, Washington, and Sevier counties and parts of Jefferson County. It is largely coextensive with the Tennessee portion of the Tri-Cities region of northeast Tennessee and southwest Virginia.

Cities and towns represented within the district include Blountville, Bristol, Church Hill, Elizabethton, Erwin, Gatlinburg, Greeneville, Johnson City, Jonesborough, Kingsport, Morristown, Mountain City Newport, Pigeon Forge, Roan Mountain Rogersville, Sneedville, Sevierville and Tusculum. The 1st district's seat in the U.S. House of Representatives has been held by Republicans since 1881.

The district's current representative is Republican Diana Harshbarger, who was first elected in 2020 following the retirement of Republican Phil Roe.

Election results from other races 
These results vary from older lines to current

Political characteristics
The 1st has generally been a very secure voting district for the Republican Party since the American Civil War, and is one of only two ancestrally Republican districts in the state (the other being the neighboring 2nd district).  Republicans (or their antecedents) have held the seat continuously since 1881 and for all but four years since 1859, while Democrats (or their antecedents) have held the congressional seat for all but eight years from when Andrew Jackson was first elected to the U.S. House of Representatives in 1796 (as the state's single at large representative) up to the term of Albert Galiton Watkins ending in 1859.

Andrew Johnson, the seventeenth President of the United States, represented the district from 1843 to 1853.

The 1st was one of four districts in Tennessee whose congressmen did not resign when Tennessee seceded from the Union in 1861. Thomas Amos Rogers Nelson was reelected as a Unionist (the name used by a coalition of Republicans, northern Democrats and anti-Confederate Southern Democrats) to the Thirty-seventh Congress, but he was arrested by Confederate troops while en route to Washington, D.C. and taken to Richmond. Nelson was paroled and returned home to Jonesborough, where he kept a low profile for the length of his term.

Like the rest of East Tennessee, slavery was not as common in this area as the rest of the state due to its mountain terrain, which was dominated by small farms instead of plantations.  The district was also the home of the first exclusively abolitionist periodicals in the nation, The Manumission Intelligencer and The Emancipator, founded in Jonesborough by Elihu Embree in 1819.

Due to these factors, this area supported the Union over the Confederacy in the Civil War, and identified with the Republican Party after Tennessee was readmitted to the Union in 1867, electing candidates representing the Unionist Party—a merger of Republicans and pro-Union Democrats—both before and after the war.  This allegiance has continued through good times and bad ever since, with Republicans dominating every level of government.  While a few Democratic pockets exist in the district's urban areas, they are not enough to sway the district. Since 1898, Democrats have only crossed the 40 percent barrier twice, in 1962 and 1976.

The district's Republican bent is no less pronounced at the presidential level. It was one of the few areas of Tennessee where Barry Goldwater did well in 1964. Indeed, Johnson and Washington counties are among the few counties in the country to have never supported a Democrat for president. Franklin D. Roosevelt turned in respectable showings in the district during his four runs for president, as did Jimmy Carter in 1976. However, Carter is the last Democrat to come close to carrying any county in the district.

The district typically gives its congressmen very long tenures in Washington; indeed, it elected some of the few truly senior Southern Republican congressmen before the 1950s. Only nine people have represented it since 1921. Two of them, B. Carroll Reece and Jimmy Quillen, are the longest-serving members of the House in Tennessee history. Reece held the seat for all but six years from 1921 and 1961, while Quillen held it from 1963 to 1997.

List of members representing the district

Recent election results

2012

2014

2016

2018

2020

2022

Historical district boundaries

See also

Tennessee's congressional districts
List of United States congressional districts

Sources
 Political Graveyard database of Tennessee congressmen

References

 Congressional Biographical Directory of the United States 1774–present

01
East Tennessee
1805 establishments in Tennessee